is a Japanese former Nippon Professional Baseball infielder.

References 

1947 births
Living people
Baseball people from Wakayama Prefecture 
Japanese baseball players
Nippon Professional Baseball infielders
Hanshin Tigers players
Managers of baseball teams in Japan
Hanshin Tigers managers